Léon Alfred Nicolas Valentin (22 March 1919, Épinal (Vosges), France - 21 May 1956, Liverpool, England) was a French adventurer, who attempted to achieve human flight using bird-like wings. Léo Valentin is widely considered to be the most famous "birdman" of all time.  He was billed as "Valentin, the Most Daring Man in the World".

Biography

Early involvement in parachuting
Léo Valentin was born in 1919 in Épinal (Vosges), France. He always had a keen interest in airplanes, and read avidly about powered aircraft and gliders. His ultimate dream was to be able to fly like the birds. At the outbreak of the Second World War he planned to become a fighter pilot, but opted to train as a paratrooper. At age 19, he joined a group of French paratroopers in Baraki, Algeria.

After the outbreak of World War II and the fall of France, he became an instructor with the rank of sergeant at a parachute school in Fez, Morocco. He then sailed to England for retraining, parachuted into Brittany as a saboteur in June 1939 and was wounded in the arm in a firefight at Loire.

After the war Valentin again served as a parachute instructor and directed his attention toward his lifelong ambition. While still in the French Army he developed the jumping technique known as the "Valentin position", allowing him better control of his movements in the air. In February 1948 he set a record for the longest free fall without a respirator. Shortly thereafter he left the army after ten years of service to continue his experiments as a civilian.

Birdman:  from concept to practice

At Villacoublay airfield, near Paris, Valentin attempted his first "wing jump" using wings made of canvas, but he failed to achieve any forward speed. He then tried rigid wings to prevent the wings from collapsing. On 13 May 1954, with the help of a set of rigid wooden wings, he finally managed some kind of stability with the initial spiral. Valentin later claimed that he managed to fly for three miles using his wooden wings.

Death
On 21 May 1956 Valentin was at a Whit Monday air show in Liverpool before 100,000 spectators (including Beatles Paul McCartney and George Harrison, as well as three-year-old Clive Barker, who would later reference Valentin in his work), using wings similar to the wooden ones that had brought him success in the past, but longer and more aerodynamic. However, the stunt immediately went wrong. When exiting the plane, one of Valentin's wings made contact and a piece broke away. He attempted to land safely using a parachute, but that also failed, and he died immediately upon hitting the ground.

Valentin's body arrived by plane at the airbase Luxeuil-St-Sauveur (BA 116), where military honours were rendered to him. Placed on a command car of the French Air Force and covered with flowers, the body arrived at the church of Saint-Sauveur, Haute-Saône, on  3 June 1956.

See also

Wingsuit flying

References

Bibliography

External links
The Birdman

Aviation pioneers
French aviators
20th-century French inventors
French military personnel of World War II
French skydivers
Parachuting deaths
Sportspeople from Épinal
1919 births
1956 deaths